Henryk Iwaniec (born October 9, 1947) is a Polish-American mathematician, and since 1987 a professor at Rutgers University.

Background and education

Iwaniec studied at the University of Warsaw, where he got his PhD in 1972 under Andrzej Schinzel. He then held positions at the Institute of Mathematics of the Polish Academy of Sciences until 1983 when he left Poland. He held visiting positions at the Institute for Advanced Study, University of Michigan, and University of Colorado Boulder before being appointed Professor of Mathematics at Rutgers University. He is a citizen of both Poland and the United States.

He and mathematician Tadeusz Iwaniec are twin brothers.

Work

Iwaniec studies both sieve methods and deep complex-analytic techniques, with an emphasis on the theory of automorphic forms and harmonic analysis.

In 1997, Iwaniec and John Friedlander proved that there are infinitely many prime numbers of the form . Results of this strength had previously been seen as completely out of reach: sieve theory—used by Iwaniec and Friedlander in combination with other techniques—cannot usually distinguish between primes and products of two primes, say.

In 2001, Iwaniec was awarded the seventh Ostrowski Prize. The prize citation read, in part, "Iwaniec's work is characterized by depth, profound understanding of the difficulties of a problem, and unsurpassed technique.

Awards and honors
He became a fellow of the American Academy of Arts and Sciences in 1995. He was awarded the fourteenth Frank Nelson Cole Prize in Number Theory in 2002.  In 2006, he became a member of the National Academy of Science. He received the Leroy P. Steele Prize for Mathematical Exposition in 2011. In 2012, he became a fellow of the American Mathematical Society. In 2015 he was awarded the Shaw Prize in Mathematics. In 2017, he was awarded the AMS Doob Prize (jointly with John Friedlander) for their book Opera de Cribro, which is about sieve theory.

Publications

See also
 List of Poles

References

Further reading
.

External links

People from Elbląg
20th-century Polish mathematicians
21st-century Polish mathematicians
Number theorists
Institute for Advanced Study visiting scholars
Rutgers University faculty
Living people
1947 births
Members of the United States National Academy of Sciences
Fellows of the American Mathematical Society
International Mathematical Olympiad participants
University of Michigan people
Recipients of the State Award Badge (Poland)
Polish twins